Margi Special  is a Nigerian cuisine indigenous to the Margi people of the northeastern region of Nigeria.
It is typically made with fish from Lake Chad, sorrel, spinach, tomatoes (and sometimes also other vegetables such as dọc mùng), and bean sprouts, in a tamarind-flavored broth. It is garnished with scented garlic as well as other herbs, according to the specific variety of the margi special recipe. It can be served alone or with pounded yam, tuwo, white rice etc.

See also

List of fish dishes
Nigerian cuisine

References

Fish and seafood soups
Nigerian cuisine
African soups
Margi cuisine